This is a list of towns and villages in County Kerry, Ireland.

A
Abbeydorney – 
Annascaul – 
Ardfert – 
Asdee -

B
Ballinskelligs – 
Ballybunion – 
Ballydavid - 
Ballyduff – 
Ballyferriter – 
Ballyhar - 
Ballyheigue – 
Ballylongford – 
Beaufort - 
Blennerville – 
Brosna –

C
Caherdaniel – 
Cahersiveen – 
Camp – 
Castlecove – 
Castlegregory – 
Castleisland – 
Castlemaine – 
Causeway – 
Chapeltown - 
Cloghane - 
Cordal – 
Cromane - 
Currans – 
Currow –

D
Derrynane – 
Dingle – 
Duagh – 
Dún Chaoin –

F
Farranfore – 
Fenit – 
Fieries - 
Finuge – 
Fybagh -

G
Glenbeigh – 
Glencar - 
Glenflesk - 
Gneeveguilla –

I
Inch -

K
Kenmare – 
Kilcummin – 
Kilflynn – 
Kilgobnet – 
Kilgarvan – 
Killarney – 
Killorglin – 
Kilmorna – 
Knightstown – 
Knocknagoshel –

L
Lauragh – 
Lispole – 
Lisselton – 
Listowel – 
Lixnaw – 
Lyracrumpane –

M
Milltown – 
Moyvane –

P
Portmagee –

R
Rathmore –

S
Scartaglen – 
Sneem – 
Spa – 
Stradbally –

T
Tarbert – 
Tralee – 
Tuosist –

V
Ventry –

W
Waterville –

References

 
Towns and villages